The Rabun County School District is a public school district in Rabun County, Georgia, United States, based in Tiger. It serves the communities of Clayton, Dillard, Mountain City, Pine Mountain, Sky Valley, Tallulah Falls, and Tiger.

Schools
The Rabun County School District has two elementary schools, one middle school, and one high school.

Elementary schools
Rabun County Elementary School
Rabun County Primary School

Middle school
Rabun County Middle School

High school
Rabun County High School - the Foxfire series of books and magazines which chronicle Appalachian traditions and culture is produced by students at Rabun County High School.

References

External links

School districts in Georgia (U.S. state)
Rabun County, Georgia